Liberty Plains Parish is one of the 57 parishes of Cumberland County, New South Wales, a cadastral unit for use on land titles. It is bounded by Parramatta Road in the north; the boundary between Flemington and Homebush, a small part of Cooks River and Liverpool Road (Hume Highway) in the east; the Hume Highway also in the south; and Woodville Road in the west. It includes the suburbs of Homebush West (Flemington), part of Strathfield, Auburn, Regents Park, Potts Hill, Sefton, Chester Hill, Bass Hill and Lidcombe. It also includes the Rookwood Cemetery. Before the parish was proclaimed in 1835, the Liberty Plains district was in the same area. The name had been given when the first settlers had desired a settlement midway between Parramatta and Sydney city. The name is still used on a motor inn in the area. In the 1851 census there were 49
houses and 270 people in the Liberty Plains parish.

References

External links
  [CC-By-SA]
*

Parishes of Cumberland County